Americium(II) bromide or americium dibromide is the chemical compound composed of an americium cation in the +2 oxidation state and 2 bromide ions in each formula unit, with the formula AmBr2.

References

Americium compounds
Bromides
Actinide halides